Ethan Natoli (born 5 April 1995) is a Italy international rugby league footballer who plays as a  or er for the London Broncos in the Betfred Championship.

He previously played for the Newtown Jets in the NSW Cup.

Background
Natoli is of Italian descent.

Playing career

Club career
Natoli previously played for the Auburn Warriors in the Ron Massey Cup.

International career
In 2022 Natoli was named in the Italy squad for the 2021 Rugby League World Cup.

References

External links
Italy profile

1995 births
Living people
Auburn Warriors players
Australian rugby league players
Australian expatriate sportspeople in England
Australian people of Italian descent
Italy national rugby league team players
Italian expatriate sportspeople in England
London Broncos players
Newtown Jets players
Rugby league centres
Rugby league locks